Hwangbo is an uncommon family name in Korea. As of 2000, there were just 9,148 people by this name in South Korea. The Hwangbo surname has two clans, the Yeongcheon Hwangbo clan and the Hwangju Hwangbo clan. The name Hwangbo originated from the Chinese surname Huangfu.

Notable people with the surname
 Hwangbo Je-gong, nobleman in the Early Kingdom of Goryeo
 Queen Sinjeong, Taejo of Goryeo's 4th Queen Consort
 Queen Daemok, Gwangjong of Goryeo's Queen Consort
 Hwangbo In (1387–1453), Joseon Dinasty politician
 Hwangbo Kwan (born 1965), South Korean footballer
 Hwangbo Seung-hee (born 1976), South Korean politician, Youth Chief of the People Power Party
 Hwangbo Hyejeong (born 1980), South Korean singer

See also 
 Korean name
 List of Korean family names
 Huangfu (Chinese surname)

References

External links 
 List of living names, with clan profiles
 2000 South Korean census results data by surname and clan
 2000 South Korean census results by surname and clan

Korean-language surnames of Chinese origin